Dale Begg-Smith  (born 18 January 1985) is an Australian-Canadian businessman and former Olympic freestyle skier. Begg-Smith won the gold medal for Australia in the men's moguls event at the 2006 Winter Olympics and silver at the 2010 Winter Olympics.

Early years
Begg-Smith formed an internet company when he was 13 years old. He was skiing for his native Canada as a teenager when his coaches told him he was spending too much time on his successful business and not enough time in training.

So Begg-Smith quit the Canadian ski program and, along with his brother Jason Begg-Smith, moved to Australia at age 16 to live with his cousin Nicole. The brothers chose to ski for Australia because the country had a smaller ski program that offered them more attention and flexibility to successfully manage their business.

The brothers stayed out of competitive skiing for three years and instead trained with the Australian team, living in Jindabyne, New South Wales each winter. The pair qualified for Australian citizenship, in 2003–04, after three years and were then free to compete for their adopted country.

Career 
Begg-Smith is one of only six Australians to win a gold medal in a Winter Games and the youngest to win an Olympic Gold in the history of men's freestyle mogul skiing.

In the lead-up to the 2006 Winter Games, Dale Begg-Smith won three World Cup rounds and was ranked world number one in the moguls' discipline.

Begg-Smith holds the record for qualifying for the most consecutive World Cup finals in events he entered. In March 2010, he reached his 48th consecutive final.  His fourth World Cup title in 2010 also put him even with French Skier Edgar Grospiron for most World Cup wins.

Begg-Smith won silver at the 2010 Winter Olympics held in his native Vancouver, leading to some complaints about biased-judging from members of the Australian coaching staff. "Sometimes you're in the good graces of the judges, sometimes you're not," Gold medalist Alex Bilodeau said. "Judged sports can't be perfect. It can be a bad part of my sport. I see it. But everybody is going to be equal in the end."

Begg-Smith represented Australia at the 2014 Winter Olympics in Sochi, reaching the 2nd qualifying round.

Personal 
Begg-Smith is considered a recluse by many, and has repeatedly refused to communicate with non-Australian media, Canadian media in particular. NBC dubbed him "the most mysterious man of the Winter Olympics" in a piece aired on 14 February 2010, during the Vancouver games.

Alisa Monk, coordinator of the moguls program, said that she booked Begg-Smith's hotels and flights economically, despite his wealth. "Wherever the team stays, he stays. There are certainly no big demands. You wouldn't know he had a bit of money." She also said, "When he is at Perisher he stays in the same hut as the other mogul skiers and his brother."

After the 2010 Haiti earthquake, Begg-Smith donated his prize money – about $13,670 – to earthquake relief efforts in Haiti.

Business controversy
There are claims that Begg-Smith's internet advertising business, Ads CPM later called CPM Media, had been linked to the distribution of malware. The Sydney Morning Herald reported that "a trail of digital fingerprints scattered over the web... shows Mr Begg-Smith's long and rewarding involvement in the distribution of "malicious software". Begg-Smith's manager, David Malina, said reports about his client's business had been "exaggerated", and that "it's not really something that he's involved with anymore ... he's minimised his involvement to concentrate on his sport."

Honours
On 21 February 2006, Australia Post issued a postage stamp commemorating Begg-Smith's achievement, saying his gold put him in a "small and honoured group of athletes". In 2005, he was awarded Ski and Snowboard Australia's Snowsports Athlete of the Year.

Results

Olympic results

World Championship results

World Cup Season Victories

World Cup Podiums

References

External links
 Begg-Smith wins another World Cup crown The Sydney Morning Herald, 19 March 2010
 NBC Olympics Profile: Dale Begg-Smith
 Dale  the question: can Australia win a mogul medal in Turin? The Sydney Morning Herald, 24 January 2006.
 'Spam man' wins gold The Age, 16 February 2006.
 AP Winter Games Profile: Dale Begg-Smith
 Dale Begg-Smith currently living on Grand Cayman Island

1985 births
Living people
Australian male freestyle skiers
Olympic freestyle skiers of Australia
Skiers from Vancouver
Freestyle skiers at the 2006 Winter Olympics
Freestyle skiers at the 2010 Winter Olympics
Freestyle skiers at the 2014 Winter Olympics
Olympic gold medalists for Australia
Olympic silver medalists for Australia
Australian businesspeople
Businesspeople from Vancouver
Canadian emigrants to Australia
Olympic medalists in freestyle skiing
Medalists at the 2010 Winter Olympics
Medalists at the 2006 Winter Olympics
Recipients of the Medal of the Order of Australia